Lubecki (femine: Lubecka, plural: Lubeccy) is a Polish surname; it may refer to:
 Franciszek Ksawery Drucki-Lubecki (1778–1846), Polish politician, minister of the treasury in the Congress Kingdom of Poland
 Daniel Lubetzky (born 1968), Mexican American billionaire businessman
 Seymour Lubetzky (1898–2003) was a major cataloging theorist

Other 
 Wola Lubecka, Lesser Poland Voivodeship, Poland
 Wola Lubecka, Świętokrzyskie Voivodeship, Poland
Polish-language surnames